The 2019 Finali Mondiali was the 2019 edition of the season-ending event for all Ferrari Challenge championships. Held at the Mugello Circuit in Italy for the first time since 2017, the event saw drivers from the Asia-Pacific, European and North American championships take part.

Two of the four reigning champions returned – with Trofeo Pirelli Pro and Coppa Shell Pro-Am champions Nicklas Nielsen and Christophe Hurni moved onto other championships. 2018 Trofeo Pirelli Pro-Am champion Fabienne Wohlwend moved into the Pro class, leaving just Coppa Shell Am champion Ingvar Mattsson to defend his title.

Classification

Trofeo Pirelli

Coppa Shell Pro-Am

Coppa Shell Am

See also
 2019 Ferrari Challenge Europe
 2019 Ferrari Challenge North America
 2019 Ferrari Challenge Asia-Pacific

References

Finali 2019
Finali Mondiali
Finali Mondiali